Daryl Janmaat (born 22 July 1989) is a Dutch professional football official and a former player who played as a right back. He is the technical director of ADO Den Haag.

He began his career at ADO Den Haag, and went on to play for the Eredivisie clubs Heerenveen and Feyenoord before joining Newcastle United in 2014 and then Watford F.C in 2016.

A full international since 2012, Janmaat has earned over 20 caps and was part of the Dutch team which finished third at the 2014 FIFA World Cup.

Club career

ADO Den Haag
Born in Leidschendam, South Holland, Janmaat started his senior career in 2007–08, with ADO Den Haag in the Eerste Divisie.

Heerenveen
In the following off-season the 19-year-old moved straight into the Eredivisie, signing for SC Heerenveen. In Heerenveen's Europa League match against Hertha Berlin on 23 October 2009, Janmaat came on as a 73rd-minute substitute for Norwegian Christian Grindheim and received a red card three minutes later for a late challenge on Nemanja Pejčinović but Heerenveen held on for a 1–0 victory. After serving a required suspension, Janmaat scored in his next Europa League appearance on 16 December 2009, netting his side's final goal in a 5–0 win over FK Ventspils at the Abe Lenstra Stadion in Heerenveen but the win proved insufficient as Heerenveen failed to qualify for the knockout stages.

On 21 December 2011, Janmaat scored Heerenveen's ninth goal in an 11–1 thrashing of Eerste Divisie side FC Oss to reach the quarter-finals of the KNVB Beker. During his four seasons with the club Janmaat was a starter in three after appearing in only ten games in his debut campaign, which ended with conquest of the Dutch Cup.

Feyenoord

In the middle of 2012, after his contract expired, he signed for fellow top-division side Feyenoord, which he had already represented as a youth. Janmaat picked up two yellow cards in the space of one minute and was sent off on 9 December 2012 as Feyenoord drew with NAC Breda 2–2 in league play. On 17 March 2013, he scored the winning goal for Feyenoord as they defeated FC Utrecht 2–1.

Janmaat scored his first goal of the 2013–14 Eredivisie season on 16 February 2014, converting a pass from Graziano Pellè as Feyenoord drew 1–1 with NAC Breda. On 13 April, he scored on the half-volley in the 76th minute as Feyenoord defeated PSV 2–0 in league play.

Newcastle United
On 17 July 2014, Janmaat joined Premier League club Newcastle United on a six-year deal for an undisclosed fee. He made his competitive debut on 17 August, playing the full 90 minutes as Newcastle began their league campaign with a 2–0 home defeat to Manchester City. On 30 August, Janmaat scored his first goal for the club in a 3–3 draw against Crystal Palace. Over the course of the season, he assisted goals in matches against West Bromwich Albion, Burnley, Crystal Palace and Aston Villa. For his defensive performances, he was announced as Player of the Year by the Newcastle United Supporters Trust.

On 15 August 2015, Janmaat was sent off for two bookable offences against Swansea City, and was therefore unavailable for the following match against Manchester United. On 25 August, and in the second round Football League Cup tie against Northampton Town, he scored the third goal in a 4–1 win. On 19 September, he scored the consolation goal in a 2–1 loss to Watford. On 23 September, he was named captain for the third round League Cup tie against Sheffield Wednesday, but was taken off at half-time, citing illness. He later assisted goals in matches against Norwich City, Crystal Palace and West Ham United.

On 2 March 2016, and after a 1–0 loss away to Stoke City, he was involved in a confrontation with Newcastle supporters. Intending to applaud the travelling supporters, but met with anger instead; he had to be turned away by Jamaal Lascelles. On 9 April, Janmaat was substituted in the first half of a 3–1 loss away to Southampton, having sustained a groin injury. In his frustration, he punched a wall and broke two of his fingers, missing the next four matches for Newcastle. Vurnon Anita replaced him in his absence, and as a result, reports linked him away from the club. He returned to the squad for the penultimate match of the season against Aston Villa, but was not brought on. He was named in the final match of the season against Tottenham Hotspur. By this time, the club were already relegated, but managed to beat Tottenham 5–1, with Janmaat assisting the fourth goal and scoring the fifth goal. A picture of a Newcastle supporter giving Janmaat a reversed two-fingered salute, as the Dutchman wheeled away celebrating his goal was widely circulated on social media.

Watford
On 24 August 2016, following Newcastle's relegation to the Championship, Janmaat signed for Premier League Watford for a fee of £7.5 million. On 12 October 2020, Watford confirmed that agreement with Janmaat was reached for Janmaat to leave on a free transfer.

Return to ADO Den Haag 
On 29 December 2020, Janmaat signed with ADO Den Haag as a free-agent. After the 2021–22 season, he retired as a player and was appointed technical director of the club.

International career
Janmaat made his debut for the Netherlands on 7 September 2012, playing the full 90 minutes in a 2–0 home win against Turkey for the 2014 FIFA World Cup qualifiers. On 31 May 2014, he was selected by national team manager Louis van Gaal to the final 23-man squad for the World Cup in Brazil. He played his first game in the tournament on 13 June, as Holland thrashed defending champions Spain 5–1. In the third-place playoff match against host nation Brazil, Janmaat came on as a late substitute for Daley Blind and provided the assist for Georginio Wijnaldum as Holland won 3–0.

Career statistics

Club

International
Appearances and goals by national team and year

Honours
Watford
FA Cup runner-up: 2018–19

Netherlands
FIFA World Cup third place: 2014

Individual
 Newcastle Player of the Year: 2015
North-East FWA Player of the Year: 2015

References

External links

 
 Daryl Janmaat at Voetbal International 
 
 National U20 data 
 National U21 data 
 
 

1989 births
Living people
People from Leidschendam
Dutch footballers
Association football defenders
Eredivisie players
Eerste Divisie players
ADO Den Haag players
SC Heerenveen players
Feyenoord players
Newcastle United F.C. players
Watford F.C. players
Netherlands youth international footballers
Netherlands under-21 international footballers
Netherlands international footballers
2014 FIFA World Cup players
Premier League players
English Football League players
Dutch expatriate footballers
Dutch expatriate sportspeople in England
Expatriate footballers in England
Footballers from South Holland